In mathematics, a P-multimagic square (also known as a satanic square) is a magic square that remains magic even if all its numbers are replaced by their kth powers for 1 ≤ k ≤ P.  squares are called bimagic,  squares are called trimagic,  squares tetramagic, and  squares pentamagic.

Constants for normal squares 
If the squares are normal, the constant for the power-squares can be determined as follows:

Bimagic series totals for bimagic squares are also linked to the square-pyramidal number sequence is as follows :-
Squares         0, 1, 4, 9, 16, 25, 36, 49, .... 
Sum of Squares  0, 1, 5, 14, 30, 55, 91, 140, 204, 285, ...   )number of units in a square-based pyramid) 
The bimagic series is the 1st, 4th, 9th in this series (divided by 1, 2, 3, n) etc. so values for the rows and columns in order-1, order-2, order-3 Bimagic squares would be 1, 15, 95, 374, 1105, 2701, 5775, 11180, ... 

The trimagic series would be related in the same way to the hyper-pyramidal sequence of nested cubes. 
Cubes		0, 1, 8, 27, 64, 125, 216, ... 
Sum of Cubes   0, 1, 9, 36, 100, ... 
Value for Trimagic squares  1, 50, 675, 4624, ... 

Similarly the tetramagic sequence 
4-Power    0, 1, 16, 81, 256, 625, 1296, ...  
Sum of 4-Power 0, 1, 17, 98, 354, 979, 2275, ...  
Sums for Tetramagic squares    0, 1, 177, ...

Bimagic square
A bimagic square is a magic square that remains magic when all of its numbers are replaced by their squares.

The first known bimagic square has order 8 and magic constant 260 and a bimagic constant of 11180.

It has been conjectured by Bensen and Jacoby that no nontrivial bimagic squares of order less than 8 exist. This was shown for magic squares containing the elements 1 to n2 by Boyer and Trump.

However, J. R. Hendricks was able to show in 1998 that no bimagic square of order 3 exists, save for the trivial bimagic square containing the same number nine times. The proof is fairly simple: let the following be our bimagic square.

{|class="wikitable" style="text-align:center;height:10em;width:10em;;table-layout:fixed"
|-
| a || b || c 
|-
| d || e || f
|-
| g || h || i
|-
|}

It is well known that a property of magic squares is that . Similarly, . Therefore,
. It follows that . The same holds for all lines going through the center.

For 4 × 4 squares, Luke Pebody was able to show by similar methods that the only 4 × 4 bimagic squares (up to symmetry) are of the form

or

An 8 × 8 bimagic square.

Nontrivial bimagic squares are now (2010) known for any order from eight to 64.  Li Wen of  China created the first known bimagic squares of orders 34, 37, 38, 41, 43, 46, 47, 53, 58, 59, 61, 62 filling the gaps of the last unknown orders.

In 2006 Jaroslaw Wroblewski built a non-normal bimagic square of order 6. Non-normal means that it uses non-consecutive integers.

Also in 2006 Lee Morgenstern built several non-normal bimagic squares of order 7.

Trimagic square
A trimagic square is a magic square that remains magic when all of its numbers are replaced by their cubes.

Trimagic squares of orders 12, 32, 64, 81 and 128 have been discovered so far; the only known trimagic square of order 12, given below, was found in June 2002 by German mathematician Walter Trump.

Higher order
The first 4-magic square was constructed by Charles Devimeux in 1983 and was a 256-order square.

A 4-magic square of order 512 was constructed in May 2001 by André Viricel and Christian Boyer.

The first 5-magic square, of order 1024 arrived about one month later, in June 2001 again by Viricel and Boyer. They also presented a smaller 4-magic square of order 256 in January 2003.  Another 5-magic square, of order 729, was constructed in June 2003 by Li Wen.

See also
Magic square
Diabolic square
 Magic cube
 Multimagic cube

References

External links 
 multimagie.com
 puzzled.nl

Magic squares